Michael Arnold Lambert (born 20 May 1950) is an English former footballer who played as a winger. He started his career with Newmarket Town before becoming a professional and played for both Ipswich Town and Peterborough United.

Lambert was also a cricketer and was on the staff at Lord's. He once represented England as 12th man against The West Indies and although he didn't get to field at any point, he did carry the drinks on and got to meet Muhammad Ali in The Windies dressing room.

Whilst playing for Ipswich, he made 210 appearances, and played as a substitute in the 1978 FA Cup Final

He ended his professional career with Peterborough United. Lambert is now a regular supporter at Portman Road.

Lambert also played cricket at minor counties level for Cambridgeshire from 1968–1979, making five appearances in the Minor Counties Championship.

Honours
Ipswich Town
FA Cup winner 1978

Individual
Ipswich Town Hall of Fame: Inducted 2015

References

External links

Players of Ipswich Town F.C.

1950 births
Living people
People from Balsham
English footballers
Association football wingers
Newmarket Town F.C. players
Ipswich Town F.C. players
Vancouver Whitecaps (1974–1984) players
Highlands Park F.C. players
Peterborough United F.C. players
Eastern Sports Club footballers
Chelmsford City F.C. players
English Football League players
North American Soccer League (1968–1984) players
English expatriate sportspeople in Canada
Expatriate soccer players in Canada
English expatriate footballers
English cricketers
Cambridgeshire cricketers
FA Cup Final players